Heathenology is the first compilation album by British metal band Balance of Power.  It was released in 2005 and features a triple-pack DVD/CD that includes:

 A 2-hour DVD of Balance of Power in concert in 2004
 Live audio CD of Balance of Power in concert,
 A compilation 'Archives of Power' CD – Re-mastered tracks picked from the first four albums.
 A 24-page, full color booklet to guide you through the first four Balance of Power albums and live photos of the band playing live.

Recording and producing 

The first compilation disc was produced and engineered by Lionel Hicks. It was recorded at POD Studios in London, England, and mixed by Todd Fitzgerald and Hicks at Oarfin Studios in Minneapolis, US. Art and design was done by Robert Duffy at PostScript Design.

The second live album was produced by Costis Papadopoulos and Hicks. It was recorded by Andy Horn and mixed and mastered by Fitzgerald and Hicks at Echobay Studios, in Minneapolis.

The third live DVD was produced by Stephen James Bland at SjB Imperial Film and Television, in London. It was filmed by Edgar Heckmann, Torsten Hartmann, Thomas Hertler, Bellinda Gielich, Sebastian Kastner, Tobias Pfahl, Tom Hack, Björn Böhm and Roland Heckmann and edited by Martin O'Leary. The DVD features additional bootleg footage by Gary Marshall, Tim McCray and Klaus.

Live footage was recorded during a live presentation of the band opening for Edenbridge.

Track listing 
Disc 1 – "Archives of Power" Audio CD

 "Prisoner of Pride"
 "Fire Dance"
 "Stranger Days to Come"
 "Higher than the Sun"
 "Seven Days into Nevermore"
 "The Pleasure Room"
 "The Other Side of Paradise"
 "Blind Man"
 "Book of Secrets"
 "Savage Tears"
 "Do You Dream of Angels"
 "One Voice"
 "Against the Odds"

Disc 2 – "Heathenology Live 2004" Audio CD

 "The Rising"
 "Heathen Machine"
 "Chemical Imbalance"
 "Shelter Me"
 "Searching for the Truth"
 "Ten More Tales of Grand Illusion"
 "No Place Like Home"
 Guitar Solo
 "Walking on Top of the World"
 "Wake Up Call"
 "Day Breaker"
 "Sins of the World"

Disc 3 – "Heathenology Live 2004" DVD

 Balance of Power – Live in concert
 Special Features

Personnel

Band members 
 John K – lead vocals
 Pete Southern – guitar
 Tony Ritchie – bass
 Lionel Hicks – drums

Additional musicians 
 Leon Lawson – keyboards

Production and recording 
 Lionel Hicks – producer, engineer, mixer
 Constantin – producer
 Todd Fitzgerald – producer
 PostScript Design – art design
 Stephen James – DVD producer, special features director
 Martin O'Leary – DVD footage editor
 Steve Mpofu – DVD special features cameraman
 SjB Imperial Film Ltd – DVD production company

References

External links 
Heathenology on Balance of Power's official website
Heathenology on Amazon
Heathenology on AllMusic

2005 compilation albums
Balance of Power (band) albums
2005 live albums
2005 video albums
Live video albums